Anna Katharina Kassautzki (born 25 December 1993) is a German politician of the Social Democratic Party (SPD) who has been a member of the German Bundestag since 2021, representing the Vorpommern-Rügen – Vorpommern-Greifswald I constituency.

Political career 
Kassautzki joined the SPD in 2014. 

In the 2021 German federal election, Kassautzki won the Vorpommern-Rügen – Vorpommern-Greifswald I constituency in Mecklenburg-Western Pomerania. This was significant as it was the seat that the former Chancellor, Angela Merkel, had held for the Christian Democrats for the previous 30 years, before Kassautzki was born. In parliament, she has since been on the Committee on Digitization and the Committee on Agriculture.

Within her parliamentary group, Kassautzki belongs to the Parliamentary Left, a left-wing movement.

Other activities 
 Foundation for Data Protection, Member of the Advisory Board (since 2022)
 Magnus Hirschfeld Foundation, Alternate Member of the Board of Trustees (since 2022)
 Federal Network Agency for Electricity, Gas, Telecommunications, Post and Railway (BNetzA), Alternate Member of the Advisory Board (since 2022)
 German United Services Trade Union (ver.di), member (since 2016)
 Willy Brandt Center Jerusalem, Member

References 

1993 births
Living people
Female members of the Bundestag
Members of the Bundestag for Mecklenburg-Western Pomerania
Members of the Bundestag for the Social Democratic Party of Germany
21st-century German women politicians
Politicians from Heidelberg